Deep shaft piercings are piercings which pass through the penile shaft. They are most commonly seen in the form of deeply placed ampallangs, apadravyas, and reverse shaft Prince Alberts. They are more rare piercings due to associated pain, difficulty, bleeding and long healing times. Common placement is directly behind the head of the penis, but they can be placed farther back.

Shaft ampallang
These piercings pass horizontally through the shaft. Since the piercing passes directly through the corpora cavernosa, it is likely that this piercing will bleed. Puncturing an artery cause significant bleeding; the piercing will likely have to be reset. This piercing is sometimes recommended to be done with an erect penis to avoid the chance of the piercing pinching when the penis becomes erect; unfortunately this practice leads to even more bleeding as both erectile chambers of the penis are engorged with blood while it is erect. In order to prevent blood loss this piercing is usually accomplished with a specially made piece of jewelry that does the piercing and then shortened and remains in place throughout the healing process, as rare as the piercing is, there are very few that succeed in fully healing, the first manner is by cauterization after the jewelry is in its final position whereby the jewelry is heated to a point that it sears the inner tissues of the corpora cavernosa. The second method which takes far longer to heal and is much more painful is a process of pushing the outer layer of skin into the hole with "retainers" forming a flesh tube through the shaft which takes from 2 to 3 months.

Either method is well beyond the skill level of most piercers, and is not recommended.

It has been reported that this piercing enhances the males sensitivity more than any other piercing due to the close proximity to nerve tissues and the resulting pressures.

Shaft apadravya

These piercings pass vertically through the shaft. They usually pass between or through the two corpora cavernosa and through the corpus spongiosum, often causing a fair amount of bleeding.

References

Penis piercings